Shooting sports at the 1982 Asian Games was held in Dr. Karni Singh Shooting Range, New Delhi, India from 22 November to 2 December 1982.

Shooting comprised eleven individual and eleven team events, all open to both men and women. Each team could enter four shooters per event but only one score from each country counts in the individual competitions.

Medalists

Medal table

References

External links
 ISSF Results Overview

 
1982 Asian Games events
1982
Asian Games
1982 Asian Games
International sports competitions hosted by India